Christian McKiel (September 27, 1889 – December 12, 1978) was a Canadian artist and educator. 

The daughter of Emma Ives Harris and Joseph Simpson Harris, county sheriff, and sister of Margaret Harris, she was born Christian Harris in Pictou, Nova Scotia. She received a teaching diploma in drawing and a Drawing Certificate from the Ladies' College at Mount Allison University in 1911. From 1911 to 1912, McKiel pursued further studies at the Art Students League of New York. She returned to Sackville in 1913 to teach in the fine arts department at Mount Allison University after the resignation of Sarah (Stewart) Hart. At Mount Allison University, she taught classes in drawing, pottery, china painting and general painting. She married Harry McKiel, later dean of science at the university, in 1917. She took classes with Frank DuMond in Cape Breton Island over three summers and with Charles Webster Hawthorne in Provincetown, Massachusetts during another summer. She also studied pottery with Kjeld and Erica Deichmann at their studio. In 1937, she acted as consultant to Mount Allison University President George Trueman around the production of blueprints of looms for use in summer programs in adult education at the school. In 1938, she became head of the Applied Arts department at Mount Allison University. McKiel was also the first woman to become a professor at the university. She retired from teaching in May of 1949.

In 1954, McKiel presented an honorary degree to Elizabeth McLeod, her former teacher and colleague, in recognition of her dedication to art education for women. 

She exhibited with the Nova Scotia Society of Artists, the Maritime Art Association, the Art Association of Montreal, the Royal Canadian Academy of Arts and the British Empire Society of Arts. She was also a member of the Canadian Society of Painters, Etchers and Engravers.

McKiel died in Sackville at the age of 89.

References 

1889 births
1978 deaths
20th-century Canadian women artists
Mount Allison University alumni
Academic staff of Mount Allison University